Miguel Ángel Rodríguez Jiménez (born 10 June 1970 in San Juan de Aznalfarache, Seville, Spain), better known as El Sevilla, is a Spanish actor and the lead singer of the comedy rock band Mojinos Escozíos. He is also a contributor on radio programs on Cadena 100 and National Spanish Radio.

Career

Mojinos escozios 

In 1994, he created the rock band, Mojinos Escozíos, when he met the other members, Vidal Barja Sr., Vidal Barja Jr., Juan Ramón Artero, and Juan Carlos Barja, in Mollet del Vallés, Barcelona. The group has sold more than 2 million albums and performed over 450 concerts in Spain. They have released 12 albums.

Radio 
He has his own program on Spanish radio station Cadena 100 titled La junla hosted by José Antonio Abellán; and another with the famous program Afectos Matinales on National Spanish Radio with Jordi Tuñón and Queralt Flotats.

He was the center of some controversy for comments made on La junla Sálvame's Jorge Javier Vázquez. Vázquez sued Rodriguez for defamation and was awarded €250.00. However, Vazquez was actually only compensated with 10.000 €.

Television 
El Sevilla has appeared on several television programs such as Andreu Buenafuente's La cosa nostra, Jesús Vazquez's La central and as an anchorman on La noche de Fuentes y Cía. by Manel Fuentes. He also made cameos on others productions, including Plats bruts, 7 Vidas, Los Lunnis and Land Rober, and was a panel judge on Gente de primera.

In February 2010 he appeared as a contestant on ¡Más que baile! over Jorge Javier Vazquez's protests. The episode was controversial due to some alleged favouritism toward one of the participants, Belén Esteban: Despite her poor rehearsal and performance, she won.

In 2014 he competed in the fourth season of Tu cara me suena, where he failed to qualify for the finals.

Performances on Tu Cara Me Suena

Discography

Filmography 
 El Cid: The Legend (2003)
 Isi/Disi. Amor a lo bestia (2004)
 Sinfín (2005)
 Isi/Disi. Alto Voltaje (2006)
 Summer Rain (2006) (uncredited)
 Ekipo Ja (2007)
 Marco (2011)

Books
 Memorias de un Homo Erectus (2003)
 Diario de un Ninja (2004)
 El hombre que hablaba con las ranas (2010)
 La ley de El Sevilla (2012)

References

External links 
 

Spanish male film actors
1970 births
Living people
21st-century Spanish singers
21st-century Spanish male singers